The 2022–23 season is the 19th season in the history of the Scarlets, a Welsh regional rugby union side based in Llanelli, Carmarthenshire. In this season, they are competing in the United Rugby Championship and the European Rugby Challenge Cup.

Friendlies

United Rugby Championship

Fixtures

League table

Welsh Shield table

European Rugby Challenge Cup

Fixtures

Table
Pool B

Knockout stage

Statistics
(+ in the Apps column denotes substitute appearance, positions listed are the ones they have started a game in during the season)

Stats correct as of match played 3 March 2023

Transfers

In

Out

References 

2022-23
Scarlets
Scarlets